The Shergold Marathon was a range of guitars and basses produced by the Shergold Woodcrafts Ltd. company. These models were produced in 4,5,6 and 8 string models.

The Marathon bass
The Marathon bass had three main scale lengths. For the standard 4-string bass, the scale length measures at 34 inches, whilst the 6 string model measured at 30 inches with a neck width some 5mm wider than that of the 4-string model. The 8-string model used the same scale length and neck width as the 4-string model.

The bass came in 5 colours, including a sunburst colour, black, cherry red, white and a 'natural' finish. Left handed models were also produced at an additional cost.

This bass came in a number of different formats over the years of production, mostly including different electronics configurations.

Mark I basses, were the earliest form of the Marathon. These typically feature stereo wiring and circuitry, with a humbucker pick-up and for earlier models a toggle switch, allowing for use in both stereo and mono configurations. This model is highly identifiable, as the bass only featured a single stereo output, which needed the use of a splitter cable. Some bassists later modified the internal electronics to bypass this and allowed them to run the bass on a single mono output.

The Mark Ia Marathon has much the same features as the Mark I, however the stereo connection port favoured in the Mark I has been replaced by a dual mono output, allowing the user to bi-amp the bass if needed. It also solved the problem of low output, a problem often found in the stereo Mark I models.

In the image there is a Marathon Mark 1 4 String Bass Guitar. It has the stereo switch clearly visible on the left hand side of the control area, and the "shergold peel" effect is evident. The model shown has a single stereo output, indicating that it is a Mark 1, not a Mark 1a.

A small number of Mark II basses were also produced before full scale production was closed down in 1982. These typically featured a rosewood bolt-on neck and mahogany body and a single mono 16 pole pick-up.

Marathon basses produced after 1992
After the closure of the Shergold company in 1992 some basses were produced by individual luthiers using left-over parts and electronics. However no official records were kept and so for identification purposes these basses are also classified as official Marathon basses.

Notable Marathon players
These include
Peter Hook, who is believed to have three Shergolds, including at least 2 6 string models as he and son, Jack Bates perform simultaneously on Marathon 6 strings with the band Peter Hook and The Light.

References

External links
 Eight string guitar
 Acoustic bass guitar

External links and references
 http://www.shergoldguitars.co.uk    Shergold official site.
 http://www.shergold.co.uk/models.html#Marathon  General information on the Marathon and all other instruments made by Shergold.
 https://web.archive.org/web/20110527045441/http://www.shergold.co.uk/imgviewer.html?class=circuits&name=Marathon-4.gif&returnto=models.html  Wiring diagram for Shergold Marathon 4 string model.

Guitars
Bass guitars